was a town located in Nakashima District, Aichi Prefecture, Japan. As of 2005, the town had an estimated population of 22,829 and a population density of 1,032.05 persons per km². The total area was 22.12 km².

On April 1, 2005, Sobue, along with the town of Heiwa (also from Nakashima District), was merged into the expanded city of Inazawa.

References 

Dissolved municipalities of Aichi Prefecture
Inazawa